Daring can mean:

Ships
Daring-class destroyer (disambiguation), three classes of destroyer
HMS Daring, seven vessels of the British Royal Navy
USS Daring (AM-87), a World War II minesweeper
SS Wallsend (1943), a cargo ship later renamed Daring 
Daring (steamboat 1909)
Daring (keelboat), a class of keelboat raced in Cowes
Daring (schooner), a cargo vessel wrecked and recovered in New Zealand

Arts and entertainment
Chris Daring, American country music fiddler
Daring, surname of the main characters in The Replacements
Daring Do, a character in My Little Pony: Friendship is Magic
the title character of the Lieutenant Daring silent film series (also one talkie)
Phoebe and Philip Daring, twin orphans in The Daring Twins and Phoebe Daring, mystery novels by L. Frank Baum

Other uses
Daring Club Motema Pembe, Congolese football club based in Kinshasa
Daring, Nancowry, a village in Andaman and Nicobar Islands of India